Bender is an extinct town in Laurens County, in the U.S. state of Georgia.

History
A post office called Bender was established in 1891, and remained in operation until 1905. The community had a depot on the Macon, Dublin and Savannah Railroad.

References

Geography of Laurens County, Georgia